Kwon You-ri (also Gwon Yu-ri, ; born July 30, 1989) is a South Korean swimmer, who specialized in long-distance freestyle and butterfly events. She is a fourth-place finalist in the 200 m butterfly at the 2006 Asian Games in Doha, Qatar.

Kwon qualified for two swimming events, as South Korea's youngest female swimmer (aged 15), at the 2004 Summer Olympics in Athens. She eclipsed FINA B-standard entry times of 8:56.56 (800 m freestyle) and 2:11.59 (200 m butterfly) from the Dong-A Swimming Tournament in Seoul. In the 200 m butterfly, Kwon challenged seven other swimmers on the second heat, including top medal favorite Éva Risztov of Hungary. She rounded out the field to last place and twenty-fourth overall by a 3.81-second margin behind Risztov in 2:14.30. In her second event, 800 m freestyle, Kwon placed twenty-second overall on the morning prelims. Swimming in heat one, she edged out fellow 15-year-old Jelena Petrova of Estonia to pick up a second seed by two tenths of a second (0.20) with a time of 9:01.42.

References

1989 births
Living people
Olympic swimmers of South Korea
Swimmers at the 2004 Summer Olympics
Swimmers at the 2006 Asian Games
South Korean female freestyle swimmers
Female butterfly swimmers
Asian Games competitors for South Korea
21st-century South Korean women